Tsvetomir Matev (Bulgarian: Цветомир Матев; born 22 June 1986) is a Bulgarian footballer who currently plays for Haskovo as a forward.

Career
Just for one transfer window, Matev has changed two teams. Firstly on 3 January 2008 he was bought from FC Haskovo to Levski Sofia. Then on 20 February 2008 he was sold to OFC Sliven 2000. In June 2008 he was loaned out for one year to FC Svilengrad 1921. On 13 July 2009 Lokomotiv Mezdra signed Matev for a two-year deal.

References

Bulgarian footballers
1986 births
Living people
FC Haskovo players
OFC Sliven 2000 players
PFC Lokomotiv Mezdra players
FC Lyubimets players
Neftochimic Burgas players
First Professional Football League (Bulgaria) players
Association football forwards
People from Haskovo
Sportspeople from Haskovo Province